Canned Music is an EP by New Zealand band Tall Dwarfs, released in 1983.

Track listing

Side A
"Canopener" - 03:12
"Beauty" - 02:06
"This Room Is Wrong" - 03:15
"Walking Home" - 02:14

Side B
"Turning Brown And Torn In Two" - 04:31
"Woman" - 03:03
"Shade For Today" - 01:47

References

Tall Dwarfs albums
1983 EPs
Flying Nun Records EPs